The United States Marine Corps (USMC) prescribes several types of military uniform to distinguish its service members from other armed services, depending on the situation.

Among current uniforms in the United States Armed Forces, the dress uniforms of the USMC have been in service the longest; the Marine Dress Blue uniform has, with few changes, been worn in essentially its current form since the late 19th century.

History 

On 5 September 1776, the Naval Committee purchased the Continental Marines uniform regulations specifying green coats with white facings (lapels, cuffs, and coat lining), with a leather high collar to protect against cutlass slashes and to keep a man's head erect. Its memory is preserved by the moniker "Leatherneck", and the high collar on Marine dress uniforms. Though legend attributes the green color to the traditional color of riflemen, Colonial Marines carried muskets. More likely, green cloth was simply plentiful in Philadelphia, and it served to distinguish Marines from the red of the British or the blue of the Continental Army and Navy. Also, Sam Nicholas's hunting club wore green uniforms, hence his recommendation to the committee was for green.

At the second founding of the United States Marine Corps in 1798, the Secretary of War authorized a blue uniform edged in red; blue chosen for naval ties, and red with sentiment for Royal Marines and John Paul Jones's Marines tradition of wearing red. A year later, Marines were issued leftover uniforms from Anthony Wayne's Legion, blue with red facings. It was the beginnings of the modern "dress blues". The uniforms also came with a round hat, edged in yellow. In 1834, President Andrew Jackson reinstated the green and white jackets of the Colonial Marines, with gray trousers. However, the dye on these faded quickly and in 1841 the uniform was returned to the blue—this time with a dark blue coat and light blue trousers with a scarlet stripe down the seam for officers and NCOs.

In 1859, new dress uniform regulations were issued; the new uniform had a French-style shako with an unpopular pom-pom. There was also the option of a fatigue cap, fashioned after the French képi. In the expeditionary period post Civil War, Marines began wearing a khaki field uniform, better suited to tropical and arid environments. In the 1890s, the Marines adopted some practical changes to the field uniform, adding a campaign cover, with a large Marine emblem on the side, and canvas leggings.

In 1901 the emblem moved from the side to the front of the campaign cover. In 1912 the Corps adopted a "Montana peak" for the campaign cover and in the same year adopted a forest green uniform. The green service uniform was adapted with a standing collar.

When the size of the Corps grew in World War I, Marines were forced to adapt surplus uniforms from the Army to clothe its troops and to maintain a similar appearance to the army to prevent soldiers from mistaking the forest green uniform for German uniforms.  The garrison cap was introduced, originally to be worn overseas, as it could easily be carried when wearing the steel helmet. This marked the first time Marines, as well as other U.S. service members, wore distinct combat and non-combat field uniforms, in addition to dress uniforms. The service uniform was designated for ceremonies, garrison, and leave.

Sometime after World War I, the tradition of a "uniform of the day" designated by the unit commander was created to ensure uniformity of troops, now that there was a wide variety of uniforms available for wear. Also born was the tradition of reporting to a new duty station in the Service "A" uniform. In 1926, the standing collar on the service uniform was changed to a rolled-flat collar, but the dress uniform collar remained standing. A khaki version of the service uniform was adapted as well, for use in summer months.

At the start of World War II, the Marine Corps had four standard uniforms. Dress Blues could be worn with a white canvas belt, a leather belt, or a blue cloth belt for officers, but their issue ceased in early 1942 except for recruiters and ceremonial units for the duration of the war. The green winter service uniform, issued with a coat and a shell cordovan garrison belt for enlisted men with a Sam Browne belt for officers (until a cloth belt of the same material replaced both in 1943), was initially worn as a field uniform (such as the 1st Provisional Marine Brigade in Iceland wearing them daily). The garrison cap was reintroduced, originally to be worn overseas, but quickly became standard. The summer khaki service uniform featured pointed pocket flaps, and the trousers had no rear pockets as opposed to the Army's trousers having both front and back pockets. Beginning with a prewar deployment to Guantánamo Bay in early 1941, a fiber pith helmet began to replace the campaign hat worn in tropical areas and by recruits in training, but was eventually phased out as field uniforms were eventually replaced with utilities and helmets in November of that year.

When the 1st Marine Division arrived in Melbourne, Australia, Australian battle dress was issued for the cooler climate. The Corps adopted its own waist length Vandegrift jacket that continued being issued.

Marine combat uniforms were adapted from Army inventories again, a tradition that would continue through until the adoption of the MCCUU in 2000. However, they made more extensive use of camouflage, due to the jungle environment being more suitable for era patterns, such as the reversible camouflage uniform was issued to some units in 1943.

The introduction of women into the Corps doubled the number of uniforms, as women had an equivalent for every male uniform. After the war, female uniforms became close to their male equivalents as women were more closely integrated into the Corps, and the green service uniform was worn year-round as the khaki summer version was discontinued. In the late 1980s, the full white dress uniform coat was discontinued, though the white dress trousers remain in use as the officer and SNCO summer Blue-white dress and for authorized junior Marines in ceremonies today.

After the Korean War, khaki utilities were replaced by OG-107 versions, which were in turn replaced in the mid-70s by ERDL pattern uniforms. The Battle Dress Uniform became the standard utilities in the early 1980s, with the woodland and 6-color desert patterns available. After the Persian Gulf War, nametapes were added to the BDU blouse and the 3-color desert pattern was adopted to address deficiencies, and worn until the MCCUU was adopted in the early 2000s.

Swagger sticks were once in vogue in the Corps, starting as an informal accessory carried by officers in the late 19th century. In 1915, it gained official approval as recruiters were encouraged to carry them to improve public image. This tradition grew when Marines deployed for World War I encountered European officers carrying swagger sticks, leading to an entry in the uniform regulations in 1922 authorizing enlisted Marines to carry them as well. The usage died down in the 1930s and 40s, excepting China Marines, and returned in vogue when a 1952 regulation encouraged them; reaching a peak from 1956 to 1960, when Commandant Randolph M. Pate encouraged use. However, his successor, David M. Shoup, quickly made them optional and discouraged their use.  In 1977 then Commandant Gen. Louis H. Wilson issued a directive banning the carrying of them while in uniform.

Types of uniforms

Dress uniform
The Marine Corps dress uniform is an elaborate uniform worn for formal or ceremonial occasions.  Its basic form of a blue jacket with red trim dates back to the 19th century. It is the only U.S. military uniform that incorporates all three colors of the U.S. flag. There are three different variations of the Dress uniform: Evening Dress, Blue Dress, and Blue-White Dress; only officers and staff non-commissioned officers (SNCOs) are authorized to wear the Evening Dress. Until 2000, there was a White Dress uniform, similar in appearance to the U.S. Navy's Dress White uniforms, but worn by officers only (in a manner similar to that of the Dress White uniforms worn in the U.S. Coast Guard). This uniform has since been replaced with the Blue/White Dress uniform for officers and SNCOs.

Blue Dress

The most recognizable uniform of the Marine Corps is the Blue Dress uniform, often seen in recruiting advertisements. It is often called Dress Blues or simply Blues. It is equivalent in formality and use to civilian black tie. The various designations are listed in descending order of formality:
 Blue Dress "A" features a midnight blue coat with standing collar. The enlisted version includes seven gilt buttons and red trim and is worn with a white web belt, while officers wear a five-button coat that omits the red trim which is worn with a black Sam Browne belt. All ranks wear a white peaked cap (known as a "barracks cover"), blue trousers, white gloves, and black dress shoes and socks. Officers wear a plain, collarless, white button up shirt with or without french cuffs. Full-sized medals are worn on the left chest, with ribbon-only awards worn on the right, but Marksmanship Qualification Badges are not worn. Women may wear pumps in place of shoes, and may wear a skirt in place of slacks. Prior to 2018, the Blue Dress uniform for female Marines featured an open collar coat worn with a white blouse and neck tab (blue for enlisted, red for officer); it has since been replaced with a new stand collar coat more similar to the one used by male Marines. A blue boatcloak with a scarlet lining is optional.
 Blue Dress "B" is the same as "A", but medals are replaced with their corresponding ribbons and all are consolidated on the left chest. Marksmanship Qualification Badges may be worn.
 Blue Dress "C" is the same as "B", but a khaki long sleeve collared shirt and tie replace the outer blue coat and white gloves. Ribbons and badges are normally worn on the shirt.
 Blue Dress "D" is the same as "C", but with a khaki short sleeve shirt and no tie.

Because the Blue Dress uniform is considered formal wear, Blue Dress "C" and "D" are rarely worn. The main exceptions are Marine recruiters and Marine Security Guards, who wear the "C" and "D" in warm weather, and Marine One pilots in place of a flight suit. Only the "B", "C", and "D" Blue Dress uniforms are authorized for leave and liberty wear; the "A" is not.

General officers wear trousers that are the same color as the coat, while all other ranks wear sky blue trousers. Officers and NCOs wear a scarlet stripe down the outer seam of each leg of the blue trousers.

A blue crewneck sweater, in the same color shade as that of the trousers, may be worn with the "C" and "D" uniforms, rank insignia is displayed on shoulder epaulettes, officers their respective ranks and anodized brass for enlisted. When wearing the crewneck sweater with the long sleeve khaki shirt, a tie is not required.

Blue-White Dress

The Blue-White Dress uniform is similar to the Blue Dress uniform, except the trousers, skirt, or slacks are white instead of blue, and do not sport scarlet stripes. The white trousers are not authorized for wear with either the long-sleeved or the short-sleeved khaki shirt, precluding the existence of "C" and "D" uniform versions.

Prior to 1998, the "Blue-White" dress uniform was authorized to be worn for the ceremonial units at Marine Barracks, Washington, D.C. (most famously the Silent Drill Platoon and Color guard). Since then, it has become the authorized summer dress uniform for all officers and SNCOs (unless they are in formation with personnel who are not authorized to wear the uniform). NCOs and junior enlisted personnel may only wear white trousers for ceremonies and social events, if authorized and provided by the command structure. This uniform replaced, in 2000, an all-white uniform, similar in appearance to that of the Navy officer's white dress uniform.

Red Dress

To differentiate themselves from the infantry, musicians—at that time, buglers and signal callers—would reverse the traditional colors. Today members of the ten Marine Corps field bands wear the standard Blue Dress uniforms, while the members of the United States Marine Band (The President's Own) and the United States Marine Drum and Bugle Corps (The Commandant's Own), both based in Washington, D.C., carry on this tradition by wearing the Red Dress uniform, which features a scarlet blouse with blue trim. The Marine Band also wears blue trousers that have a white line bisecting 2 scarlet stripes on each leg.

Like the Blue-White Dress uniform, musicians are not authorized to wear the khaki shirts with the Red-Dress uniform. Should the condition warrant (e.g., summer heat), the band will wear a white shirt with the Blue Dress uniform trousers.

Evening Dress

Evening Dress is the most formal (and by U.S. military standards, the most elaborate) of the dress uniforms, and is the equivalent of white tie in usage. It is authorized for wear only by officers and SNCOs, and a required uniform item only for senior officers (majors and above). It comes in three varieties:
 Evening dress "A" For male officers, it consists of an evening coat with sleeve ornamentation, strip collar, white waistcoat, and white shirt with piqué bib. The stripe on the midnight-blue trousers is a thin red stripe inside a gold embroidered stripe. Female officers wear a mess jacket with scarlet collar, a white dress shirt, a red cummerbund, and a long skirt. Miniature medals and badges are worn.
 Evening dress "B" is identical to Evening Dress "A" except men wear a scarlet waistcoat (general officers) or cummerbund (all other officers), and women may wear a short skirt. Miniature medals and badges are worn.
 SNCO Evening Dress Male staff non-commissioned officers wear a semi-formfitting mess jacket with a black bow tie and sky blue trousers. Female SNCOs wear identically the same Evening Dress as female officers, minus the sleeve ornamentation and placement of rank. Both wear the jackets with historic 1890s-era rank insignia sewn on the sleeves. Miniature medals and badges are worn.

A blue boatcloak with a scarlet liner is optional. Junior officers not required to possess Evening Dress may substitute Blue or Blue-White dress "A". It is appropriate for such occasions as state functions, inaugural receptions and dinners, and formal dinners.

Service uniform

The service uniform consists of green and khaki colors. The present service uniform of the USMC for enlisted Marines was adopted in 1943 making it the oldest service uniform still in use by the United States armed forces. It is roughly equivalent in formality and function to a business suit.

It is the prescribed uniform when:
 serving on a court-martial
 attending appearance in criminal court (off installations).
 making official visits and calls on U.S. and foreign dignitaries, officials, and military officers.
 visiting the White House, except when in a tourist capacity, or on an occasion where another uniform is specified.
 reporting for duty onshore
Like the Blue Dress uniform, the service uniform is authorized for wear while on leave or liberty.

The service uniforms are designated:
 Service "A" (or Alpha) is the base uniform. It consists of a green coat, green trousers with khaki web belt, khaki long-sleeve button-up shirt, khaki tie, tie clasp, and black shoes. The coat is cut to be semi-form fitting, with ribbons and marksmanship badges worn on the left chest of the coat. Women wear a green necktab in place of the tie, pumps instead of shoes, and have the option of wearing a skirt instead of slacks. It is sometimes appropriate to remove the jacket while indoors.
 Service "B" (or Bravo) is identical to the "A" except the coat is removed. Ribbons may be worn on the shirt.
 Service "C" (or Charlie) is identical to the "B" except with a short-sleeve button-up shirt and no tie.

There are two types of authorized headwear for the service uniform. Both men and women may wear the green soft garrison cap, sometimes nicknamed a "piss cutter". There is the option of wearing a peaked cap (called a barracks cover). The design of these covers had differed between women and men. However, in late 2013, the Commandant of the Marine Corps approved the Marine Corps Uniform Board's recommendation to adopt the male dress and service cap as the universal dress and service cap for all Marines, male and female. As on the Blue Dress uniform, officers wear rank insignia on the shoulder epaulettes of their jackets and the collars of their shirts, while enlisted personnel wear rank insignia sewn on their sleeves.

A green crewneck sweater (originally adopted from British Army and Royal Marines issue) in the same color shade as that of the trousers may be worn with the "B" and "C" uniforms. When wearing the crewneck sweater with the long sleeve khaki shirt, a tie is not required.

Utility uniform

The Marine Corps Combat Utility Uniform or MCCUU is intended for wear in the field or for working parties but has become the typical working uniform for all deployed and most garrison Marines and Sailors. Previously, Marines wore the same utility uniforms as the Army. Unlike the dress and service uniforms, utility uniforms are not permitted for wear on leave or liberty (i.e., while off-duty), except when traveling in a vehicle between a place of duty and a residence, or in emergency stops.

The uniform consists of a camouflage blouse and trousers, green undershirt, and tan (specifically "olive mojave") suede boots. The uniform uses MARPAT digital camouflage patterns, of which there are two approved varieties. The first is a four-color woodland pattern in green, tan, brown, and black, while the other is a three-color desert pattern in tan, brown, and grey. Both officers and enlisted Marines wear pin-on rank insignia on each collar point. Enlisted insignia is always black, while officers wear bright metal insignia in garrison and subdued insignia in the field. Most badges and breast insignia are authorized for wear on the utility uniform, shined or subdued as appropriate.

The variety worn depends on the environment; deployed Marines wear whichever color is more appropriate to the climate and terrain. The desert MCCUU is only worn in appropriate field environments During the summer months, Marines in garrison will roll the sleeves of the woodland blouse, tightly folded up to the biceps, exposing the lighter inside layer, and forming a neat cuff to present a crisper appearance to the otherwise formless uniform. In the past, when Marines wore the same utilities as the Army and Air Force, this served to distinguish them from the other branches, who folded the sleeves in with the camo facing out. In Haiti, the practice earned them the nickname "whitesleeves".

The approved headwear is the utility cover, an eight-pointed brimmed hat that is worn "blocked", that is, creased and peaked. In the field, a boonie cover is also authorized. The trouser legs are "bloused", or the cuffs are rolled inside and tightened over their boots with a spring or elastic band known as a "boot band" or "blousing garter". With the introduction of the Marine Corps Martial Arts Program (MCMAP), Marines now wear a color-coded MCMAP belt or rigger instead of the old web belt, indicating their level of proficiency in MCMAP (the web belt was phased out in 2008 due to a requirement for all Marines to achieve a tan belt rank by then).

In combat, Marines will also wear one of two ballistic vests: the Outer Tactical Vest and the newer Modular Tactical Vest, as well as the Lightweight Helmet (replacing the PASGT helmet) and Improved Load Bearing Equipment. Marines in a combat area may also wear Flame Resistant Organizational Gear, or FROG uniforms. These combat uniforms are designed to reduce fire-related injuries, and look quite similar to the MCCUU. Other individual equipment may be worn as directed.

Physical training uniform

The physical training uniform consists of the following:
 Plain olive-drab green nylon shorts and polyester T-shirt (shirts with unit logos can be authorized)
 OD green sweats with the Marine Corps emblem printed in black on the left chest of sweatshirt and thigh of sweatpants
 OD green tracksuit with reflective piping, reflective Marines emblem on the left chest of jacket and on the upper right leg of pants, "Marines" lettering in scarlet with yellow lining on back of jacket and USMC lettering in the same design on the lower right leg of pants. It was unveiled during a tour of Iraq in December 2007 by former Commandant of the Marine Corps General James Conway, and was released in February 2008.

In addition, Marines can wear a watch cap and gloves in cold weather, or a hydration pack to prevent dehydration.

Miscellaneous uniform items

The following items may be worn at the individual's discretion, except when in formation, ceremony, inspection, or when the commander decrees that uniformity is required:
 Grey all-weather coat (which is a double-breasted trenchcoat with removable liner) is authorized for wear with all uniforms during inclement and cold weather (ceremonial units at Marine Barracks, 8th&I have their own special Dress-blue trenchcoat with red piping).
 Dress Blue Wool greatcoat, (double breasted with gold buttons), is used only with the Dress Blue uniform
 Blue boatcloak (Males) or Blue Dress Cape (females) with a scarlet lining is optional for use by officers, warrant officers, and SNCO's only on Evening Dress and Dress Blue uniforms.
 Grey tanker jacket is authorized with the Dress "C" and "D" and Service "B" and "C" except when the all-weather coat is worn.
 Green service sweater may be worn with the MCCUU (but only with and under the blouse).
 Gloves may be worn at the individual's discretion except when uniformity is required such as in a formation ceremony (white for Dress, black for Service, black or olive green for Utilities).
 Olive green undershirt with a unit insignia or other design may be worn in lieu of a plain olive green undershirt for the MCCUU or with the PT uniform (a custom shirt will not be mandatory unless provided without cost to the individual).
 Purses may be worn or carried by females only, while umbrellas can be used by both males and females (when appropriate in dress or service uniforms) and must be black and plain.
 Female Marines may wear the Service or Utility maternity uniforms when the standard items will no longer fit. There is no maternity dress uniform, while the maternity MCCUU comes in both woodland and desert patterns.
 Various organizational clothing items may be worn with the utility uniform during inclement or cold weather, to include the All Purpose Environmental Clothing System (APECS) parka and trousers, the Combat Desert Jacket, or rain poncho.
 Plain black and white plastic name tags may be worn above the right breast pocket of the dress and service uniforms only when mandated by the commanding officer. This is usually seen by instructors at schools or conferences, by recruiters, and by drill instructors or NROTC advisors.
 Drill instructors and certain range personnel (such as Primary Marksmanship Instructors) wear the campaign cover  with the service and utility uniforms when they are in an instructing billet, such as at recruit training or related activities.
Primary Marksmanship Coaches wear the American fiber helmet with the utility uniforms.

Working uniforms will be worn when the individual's duties require, to include coveralls, flight suits, cooking uniforms, and other safety clothing like goggles, gloves, or aprons.

Insignia, rank, and other accoutrements

Like any uniform, Marine uniforms have many accoutrements whose symbolism may not be obvious. One of the most notable adornments is the Eagle, Globe, and Anchor, found in some manner on most uniforms; it is even within the MARPAT digital camouflage pattern. It is also the standard cap badge for all uniform covers. An older insignia, progenitor to the Eagle, Globe, and Anchor can be seen in modern dress and service coat buttons.

The "blood stripe" is found on the outside seams of the dress uniform trousers of NCOs, SNCOs, and officers. Tradition holds that it represents the high casualty rates of those leaders during the Battle of Chapultepec. Officers wearing the Evening Dress uniform also have additional gold trim on the trouser stripe.

Various uniforms display rank insignia differently. Enlisted Marines will wear chevrons on the sleeves of all uniforms but the Utility and other working uniforms: gold stripes on red for the Dress coat, green stripes on red for the service coat, green stripes on khaki for the khaki short and long sleeve shirts, and black metal or plastic pin-on insignia on the collar of the utility and other working uniforms and the all-weather coat. The same insignia is pinned on the epaulettes of the wool sweaters and tanker jacket. Officers will wear large insignia on the epaulettes of dress, evening dress, and service coats as well as sweaters and tanker jacket; smaller insignia is worn on the collar of all other uniforms (officers in a combat environment may wear subdued insignia, where flat black replaces silver and flat brown replaces gold). Chief Warrant Officers who are designated "Infantry Weapons Officer" with an MOS of 0306 (also known as "Marine Gunner") (or historically those in a combat arms MOS, which included artillery and communications among others during the Korean War era) replace their left insignia with a gold or black bursting bomb. Navy personnel authorized to wear Marine uniforms wear their assigned rate.  Musicians in the United States Marine Band replace the crossed rifle in their insignia with lyres to denote their non-combat role.

Marines wear awards in several ways. Large medals are authorized only on the Dress "A" uniform, while awards for which no medal was struck will have ribbons mounted on the opposite pocket. Miniature medals are worn on the Evening Dress uniform, and are authorized for wear with civilian tuxedos when appropriate to the event. Other dress and service uniforms are worn with ribbons and weapon qualification badges, though the unit commander may decide to forgo the latter. Breast insignia, also known as badges, are similarly worn, though individuals have the option of wearing subdued insignia on the utility uniform.

The buttons on the dress and service coats are reminiscent of Marine insignia prior to the adoption of the Eagle, Globe, and Anchor. The quatrefoil—the cross-shaped braid worn atop an officer's cover—is a distinguishing part of the Marine officer's uniform. The design is of French origin, and is a tradition from the pre-Civil War era when officers wore a rope cross on their caps to allow sharpshooters high in the rigging of a sailing ship to identify his allies in a battle. Enlisted Marines wear service stripes on the cuff of the dress and service coats, each stripe denoting four years of service as a Marine. The standing collar of the dress coat is reminiscent of the uniform that earned Marines the nickname "Leatherneck".

Green cartridge belts or brassards can be worn by personnel in an authoritative or ceremonial duty status (such as drill instructors or fire watch sentries), wearing such items regards the individuals as "under arms" whether they are actually carrying a weapon or not. As such, they do not uncover indoors. During ceremonies, officers have the option of wearing a Sam Browne belt and the Mameluke sword, and Noncommissioned Officers may wear the NCO sword. The current Mameluke sword is modeled on the sword presented to First Lieutenant Presley O'Bannon by the Ottoman Empire viceroy, Prince Hamet, in 1804, during the First Barbary War, as a gesture of respect and praise for the Marines' actions at the Battle of Derne.

Members of the 5th and 6th Marine Regiments wear the French Fourragère to represent the multiple awards of the Croix de Guerre by the French government in World War I.

Wear by Navy personnel

Navy officers and enlisted sailors assigned to Marine units are authorized to wear all Marine uniforms except the Dress and Evening Dress uniforms. When wearing Marine uniforms, Navy personnel must meet and adhere to Marine grooming and physical regulations, as well as replace Marine insignia with U.S. Navy insignia whenever feasible. These members of the Fleet Marine Force include doctors, dentists, nurses, medical service, hospital corpsmen, chaplains, religious program specialists, lawyers, legalmen, naval gunfire liaison officers, divers, and Naval Academy midshipmen who are selected for Marine officership.

Most Marine units will have, at minimum, Navy medical and religious personnel, who will be issued and required to wear the MCCUU; wear of other Marine uniforms is optional. Medical battalions and dental battalions, being almost entirely Navy officers and sailors, may direct other uniform wear. Other units, such as artillery, aviation, or legal units, may have other Navy personnel attached, and issued Marine uniforms.

Comparison with the Army
Marines are sometimes confused with United States Army soldiers, but there are several significant differences:
 Marines wear boots only with the utility uniform, while certain airborne-qualified and ceremonial Army units are authorized to wear shined black boots with service/dress uniforms. Both services make exceptions for boots with other working uniforms, such as coveralls, aviation, and cold weather uniforms.

 The Marine utility cover is an 8-pointed creased and peaked cover, the Army uses a rounded kepi-style patrol cap. Unlike the Army, Marines do not currently wear rank insignia on the cover (although they did for about two years between 1986 and 1988), instead there is an Eagle, Globe, and Anchor in the middle of the cover.
 Marines wear woodland MARPAT camouflage utilities, or the desert variation when deployed in environmentally appropriate areas. Marines roll the sleeves up, with the exception when deployed. The Army wears Operational Camouflage Pattern Army Combat Uniforms and rolled sleeves are authorized only at the unit level. The undershirt for Marines is olive green and for the Army it is brown.
 Marines are not authorized to wear their utility uniforms off-base while on leave or liberty, except while in a vehicle traveling to or from base, or in an emergency. The Army offers more leeway in this regard, but still prohibits casual wear of utilities, especially in social or drinking scenarios.
 The Marine service uniform is a forest green coat with a belted waist and matching trousers worn with khaki shirt and khaki tie. The current Army green service uniform is a dark olive coat with a belted waist and contrasting drab trousers worn with a tan shirt and olive tie. 
 The Marine blue dress uniform features a stand collar and red stripe in the trousers, while the Army blue dress uniform features an open collar worn with a white shirt and black tie, and a gold stripe on the trousers.
 The Marine service and dress uniforms displays fewer items - only rank insignia, ribbons, marksmanship badges, and breast insignia. The Army service uniform contains, in addition, branch insignia, distinctive unit and regimental insignia, combat and special skill badges, shoulder sleeve insignia (only on the green service uniforms), and skill qualification tabs above current unit shoulder sleeve insignia like the Ranger Tab or Sapper Tab.
 Likewise, Marines wear few items on their utilities, compared to the Army, which wear U.S. flag patches, shoulder sleeve insignia, service tabs, and have the option of wearing subdued combat and special skill badges when in garrison. Typically, the only distinguishing features on Marine utilities are service and name tapes; Eagle, Globe, and Anchor emblem; rank insignia; breast insignia (which is not worn in the field) and (depending on the personnel) the Red Patch.
 Marine service caps or barracks covers differ from their Army counterparts. The Marine cover sits higher and has a slightly larger and more pronounced crown that is less peaked and flat than the Army service cap. This distinctive look dates back to Marine barracks cover design used since World War II. In addition, Marine general officers' service caps do not have oak leaf embroidery around the headband as Army general officer caps, with the exception of the Commandant of the Marine Corps (and also if the Chairman of the Joint Chiefs of Staff is a Marine) who has oak leaf embroidery in the front part of the headband, sharing only the oak leaf design on the visor.
 Marine officer rank insignia is slightly different from Army insignia in design. When wearing a collared shirt, Marine officers wear their insignia on the shirt collar, unlike the Army, where officer rank is worn on the shirt epaulettes.

See also
 Uniforms of the United States Armed Forces

References

Further reading
The Uniforms, Weapons & Accouterments of the United States Marine Corps during the American Civil War (2005), by James Morrow
The Civil War Uniforms of the United States Marine Corps: The Regulations of 1859 (October 23, 2009), by Charles H. Cureton and David M. Sullivan

External links

 
 Marine Uniform Regulations
 Permanent Marine Corps Uniform Board

United States Marine Corps
Marine